Ravindra Karunaratne (born 31 March 1987) is a Sri Lankan cricketer. He made his first-class debut for Saracens Sports Club in the 2007–08 Premier Trophy on 25 January 2008. He made his Twenty20 debut for Negambo Cricket Club in the 2018–19 SLC Twenty20 Tournament on 15 February 2019.

See also
 List of Chilaw Marians Cricket Club players

References

External links
 

1987 births
Living people
Sri Lankan cricketers
Chilaw Marians Cricket Club cricketers
Kurunegala Youth Cricket Club cricketers
Negombo Cricket Club cricketers
Saracens Sports Club cricketers
Place of birth missing (living people)